Deo Nukhu is an Indian politician. He was elected to the Nagaland Legislative Assembly from Chizami constituency in the 2013, 2008 and 2003 Nagaland Legislative Assembly election as a member of the Samata Party, Indian National Congress and Naga People's Front. He is current member of National People's Party.

References 

Living people
Samata Party politicians
Naga People's Front politicians
Indian National Congress politicians
National People's Party (India) politicians
People from Phek district
Nagaland MLAs 2013–2018
Year of birth missing (living people)
Nagaland MLAs 2008–2013
Nagaland MLAs 2003–2008